Heaton Moor RUFC is a Rugby union football club, based in Stockport in the North West of England. The club was formed in 1899. The home ground of Heaton Moor is The Heaton's Sports Club situated on Green Lane, in the village of Heaton Moor, Stockport. The club plays in the ADM Lancashire Rugby Union Leagues, Championship Division.

Club honours
Lancashire North 2 champions: 1993–94
North Lancs 1 champions (2): 2004–05, 2007–08
Lancashire Senior Colts Cup winners 2017-18

References

English rugby union teams
Sport in Stockport
Rugby clubs established in 1899
1899 establishments in England